Huo Xuan (27 January 1988 – 31 October 2016) was a Chinese female volleyball player. She was part of the China women's national volleyball team, including at the 2009 FIVB World Grand Prix. On club level she played for Henan.

Xuan died on 31 October 2016 following a heart attack.  She was 28.

References

External links
 Profile at FIVB.org

1988 births
2016 deaths
Chinese women's volleyball players
Place of birth missing
Wing spikers
21st-century Chinese women